San Marino competed at the 2011 World Aquatics Championships in Shanghai, China between July 16 and 31, 2011.

Swimming

San Marino qualified 3 swimmers.

Men

Women

Synchronised swimming

San Marino has qualified 2 athletes in synchronised swimming.

Women

References

2011 in San Marino
Nations at the 2011 World Aquatics Championships
San Marino at the World Aquatics Championships